Leuronectes is a genus of beetles in the family Dytiscidae, containing the following species:

 Leuronectes andinus (Guignot, 1958)
 Leuronectes curtulus Régimbart, 1899
 Leuronectes darlingtoni Guéorguiev, 1971
 Leuronectes gaudichaudii (Laporte, 1835)
 Leuronectes muelleri (Kirsch, 1865)

References

Dytiscidae